Shapeshifter is a 2005 horror film with supernatural elements created by the independent film group The Asylum. It was directed by Gregory Lemkin who also co-wrote the film.

Plot
Inmates and guards alike become trapped in a maximum security prison when they fall prey to a demonic beast that feeds on human flesh. As the creature's power multiplies with every kill, their only chance for survival is to uncover the ancient mystery that holds the power of the shapeshifter.

Release
Shapeshifter was released on DVD by The Asylum Home Entertainment on November 29, 2005.

Reception

Jon Condit from Dread Central panned the film, awarding it a score of one out of five. In his review, Condit criticized the film's lack of originality, weak characters, and  slow pacing; calling it "a thoroughly dull demonic monster in a prison flick almost completely devoid of energy or imagination."

References

External links
 
 
 

2005 films
2005 horror films
2005 independent films
The Asylum films
Films about shapeshifting
Films directed by Gregory Lemkin
Films set in prison
American supernatural horror films
American monster movies
American exploitation films
American splatter films
2000s English-language films
2000s American films